Theobald of Langres (fl. late 12th century) was a scholastic teacher and author, probably a lay schoolmaster, although he has also been identified as a Cistercian. He elaborated and expanded on the work of William of Auberive and Geoffrey of Auxerre, crafting a more systematic theory of numerical symbolism. He left behind one treatise on the subject, De quatuor modis quibus significationes numerorum aperiuntur, written in a dry style. It has been edited critically by René Delaflie (1978) and Hanne Lange (1979). A bit of Theobald's advice is:
When you want to sacramentize a number [i.e., "make it mean"], you should unfold the aforesaid ways of sacramentizing, and turn them over in your mind, because in such frequent consideration, you may perhaps find what you are looking for, lying hidden.

References
Notes

Citations

Sources

Further reading

12th-century French writers
12th-century Latin writers